The men's high jump event at the 2017 European Athletics Indoor Championships was held on 4 March at 11:20 (qualification) and 5 March at 16:50 (final) local time.

Medalists

Records

Results

Qualification

Final

References

2017 European Athletics Indoor Championships
High jump at the European Athletics Indoor Championships